Five ships of the Royal Navy have borne the name HMS Cadmus, after Cadmus, a prince in Greek mythology:

 was a 10-gun  launched in 1808. She became a Coastguard watch vessel in 1835, was renamed WV24 in 1863 and was sold in 1864.
She was renamed HMS Cadmus in 1863 whilst serving as a watch vessel, and was sold in 1901.
 was a wooden screw corvette launched in 1856 and broken up in 1879.
 was a  sloop launched in 1903 and sold in 1921.
 was an  launched in 1942 and sold to the Belgian Navy in 1950. She was renamed Georges Lecointe, and served until 1959. She was scrapped in 1960.

Royal Navy ship names